Awad Mahmoud (born 1 January 1963) is a Sudanese judoka. He competed in the men's lightweight event at the 1992 Summer Olympics.

References

1963 births
Living people
Sudanese male judoka
Olympic judoka of Sudan
Judoka at the 1992 Summer Olympics
Place of birth missing (living people)